Baksi is a surname. Notable people with the surname include:

Joe Baksi (1922–1977), American heavyweight boxer
Kurdo Baksi (born 1965), Swedish social commentator and author
Mahmud Baksi (1944–2000), Kurdish writer and journalist